The World According to Jeff Goldblum is a 2019 American documentary streaming television series presented by Jeff Goldblum streaming on Disney+ from November 12, 2019.

The second season premiered on November 12, 2021.

Premise

The series follows Jeff, in which he 'explores the world'. He does this by covering topics such as video games, ice-creams and sneakers by chatting with influencers and experts with broad knowledge and experience in these particular subjects.

Production
The show was announced as part of the National Geographic presentation during Disney's investor meeting on April 11, 2019 for Disney+.

Filming 
The production started in April 2019.
During filming, Jeff Goldblum researched as little as possible on the topics being presented on the show. He explores a wide range of products including sneakers, ice creams, tattoos and bicycles.

Topics for the second season had been planned, and shooting had begun in early 2020, before being shut down as a consequence of COVID-19 restrictions. The first episode was due to be on fireworks, and Goldblum had apparently filmed an interview with an astronaut for the series. Despite Goldblum's uncertainty as to whether or not this material would be used once filming resumed,  both of these segments appeared in episodes of Season 2. 

As of August 2022, there was yet to be an official announcement about a third season, although Goldblum expressed an interest in continuation of the series.

Episodes

Season 1 (2019–20)

Season 2 (2021–22)

Release 
The first episode of the series made its debut on November 12, 2019, the launch date of Disney+. The episodes were released weekly in 4K HDR.

The first five episodes of season 2 launched on November 12, 2021, which Disney called Disney+ Day, with the rest of season 2 to follow on January 19, 2022.

Promotion 
Disney+ released the first look poster on August 23, 2019 coinciding with its panel at D23 Expo. Later during their presentation they released the full trailer.

Reception

Critical response 
The review aggregator website Rotten Tomatoes reported an 82% approval rating for the first season with an average rating of 7.60/10, based on 22 reviews. The website's critical consensus reads, "While fans of the man will find much to like in this quirky and upbeat -- if not terribly educational -- docuseries, those not already attuned to his particular sense of style may not appreciate The World According to Jeff Goldblums singular view." Metacritic, which uses a weighted average, assigned a score of 64 out of 100 based on 8 critics, indicating "generally favorable reviews."

Daniel Fienberg of The Hollywood Reporter called the series entertaining and pleasurable, found Jeff Goldblum to be an enthusiastic and performative host who is genuinely interested in the topics covered across the show, and appreciated that the series focuses more on curiosity and amusement than providing an educational experience. Joel Keller of Decider found Jeff Goldblum to be an entertaining presenter, stating the actor manages to turn everyday life topics into interesting and quirky ones. Joyce Slaton of Common Sense Media rated the series 4 out of 5 stars, complimented the depiction of positive messages, such as curiosity, and found Goldblum to be an easy-going presenter who is interested in the topics he covers. James White of Empire rated the show 4 out of 5 stars, stated that Goldblum manages to be a friendly and optimistic host through the series, and found the animation providing factual information vivid.

Accolades

References

External links
 
 
 

2010s American documentary television series
2020s American documentary television series
2019 American television series debuts
Disney+ original programming
Documentary television series about industry
Documentary television series about technology
English-language television shows
National Geographic (American TV channel)